The 1952 Soviet Class B football championship. 

FC Lokomotiv Kharkov winning the championship.

Teams

Relegated teams
Two teams were relegated from the 1951 Soviet Class A (top tier).
 VMS Moscow (return after a year absence)
 FC Torpedo Gorkiy (return after a year absence)

Promoted teams
Two teams received direct promotion. One team were promoted from republican competitions through last year post-season playoffs.
 DO Tbilisi – Winner of the 1951 Football Championship of the Georgian SSR (return after a two-year absence)
 DO Sverdlovsk – Winner of the 1951 Football Championship of the Russian SFSR (return after a two-year absence)
 DO Kiev – Winner of the 1951 Football Championship of the Ukrainian SSR and promotion play-off (return after a two-year absence)

First stage

Group Kharkov

Group Ivanovo

Group Baku

Second stage

For places 1-9

For places 10-18
Played in Rostov-na-Donu

Relegation play-off
To the play-off qualified the champion of the 1952 Football Championship of the Ukrainian SSR and the worst Ukrainian team of masters of the 1952 Soviet Class B.

|}

Number of teams by republics

See also
 1952 Soviet Class A
 1952 Soviet Cup

References

 1952 at rsssf.com

1952
2
Soviet
Soviet